The 2005 IIFA Awards, officially known as the 6th International Indian Film Academy Awards  ceremony, presented by the International Indian Film Academy honoured the best films of 2004 and took place between 9–11 June 2005.

The weekend began with the IIFA Inaugural Press Conference at which IIFA Brand Ambassador, actor Amitabh Bachchan, officially launched the three-day extravaganza.

This was followed by the IIFA World Premiere held at the centuries-old Pathe Tuschinski Theatre. The film screened was Pradeep Sarkar's Parineeta.

This was the first year where the IIFA Film Festival was held which showcased some of the best films Indian Cinema has to offer. It was inaugurated by Yash Chopra and was held at the Pathe Tuschinski Theatre.

An IIFA Workshop was also held which served as a unique meeting between some prominent filmmakers from India and Dutch film professionals. Key speakers at the workshop included Karan Johar, Shabana Azmi, Javed Akhtar and Abhishek Bachchan. The workshop also featured a screening of the blockbuster Kal Ho Naa Ho.

Other events included the FICCI-IIFA Global Business Forum and the IIFA Foundation Celebrity Cricket Match. The IIFA Foundation Celebrity Cricket Match saw teams captained by Shahrukh Khan and Hrithik Roshan face against each other with Hrithik's team emerging as the victors.

The official ceremony took place on 11 June 2005, at the Amsterdam Arena, in Amsterdam, Netherlands. During the ceremony, IIFA Awards were awarded in 29 competitive categories. The ceremony was televised in India and internationally on Star Plus. Actors Fardeen Khan and Shahrukh Khan along with director Karan Johar co-hosted the ceremony. Along with the award distribution, the ceremony also included performances by international pop group Bombay Rockers, international magician Hans Kolak, Salman Khan, Malaika Arora Khan, Amrita Arora, Esha Deol, Isha Sharvani, Shahid Kapoor, Kareena Kapoor and Daler Mehndi. It also included Abhishek Bachchan's first-ever international performance.

Mujhse Shaadi Karogi led the ceremony with 13 nominations, followed by Veer-Zaara with 11 nominations and Aitraaz with 10 nominations.

Veer-Zaara won 7 awards, including Best Film, Best Director (for Yash Chopra), Best Actor (for Shah Rukh Khan), Best Supporting Actress (for Rani Mukerji) and Best Music Director (for Late Madan Mohan), thus becoming the most-awarded film at the ceremony.

Other multiple awards winners included Mujhse Shaadi Karogi with 5 awards, Aitraaz, Dhoom and Murder with 3 awards each, and Main Hoon Na and Maqbool receiving 2 awards each.

In addition, movies receiving a single award included, Chameli for (Best Cinematography), Swades for (Best Lyricist), Taarzan: The Wonder Car for (Best Female Debut), Hum Tum for (Best Actress) and Yuva for (Best Supporting Actor).

Shah Rukh Khan received dual nominations for Best Actor for his performances in Swades and Veer-Zaara, winning for the latter.

Rani Mukerji set an unmatched record by becoming the only actress till date to win both popular female acting awards in the same year, winning Best Actress for Hum Tum and Best Supporting Actress for Veer-Zaara. She also received an additional Best Supporting Actress nomination for her performance in Yuva.

Background
The awards began in 2000 and the first ceremony was held in London at The Millennium Dome. From then on the awards were held at locations around the world signifying the international success of Bollywood. The next award ceremony was announced to be held in Dubai, UAE in 2006.

Winners and nominees
Winners are listed first and highlighted in boldface.

Popular awards

Musical awards

Backstage awards

Technical awards

Special awards

Lifetime Achievement Award
 V. K. Murthy
 Shabana Azmi

Samsung Style Icon Award
 Hrithik Roshan

Samsung Style Diva Award
 Preity Zinta

Global Indian Media Personality Trophy
 Aishwarya Rai

Multiple nominations and awards

The following eleven films received multiple nominations:
 Thirteen: Mujhse Shaadi Karogi
 Eleven: Veer-Zaara
 Ten: Aitraaz
 Seven: Dhoom, Main Hoon Na, Swades
 Five: Hum Tum and Murder
 Three: Maqbool
 Two: Ab Tak Chhappan, Chameli, Ek Hasina Thi, Hulchul, Musafir and Yuva

The following films received multiple awards:
 Seven: Veer-Zaara
 Five: Mujhse Shaadi Karogi
 Three: Aitraaz, Dhoom and Murder
 Two: Main Hoon Na and Maqbool

References

Iifa Awards
IIFA awards